Henry Townley Heald (1904–1975) was the first president of Illinois Institute of Technology and the Ford Foundation.

Career
Heald was president of Armour Institute of Technology from 1937 to 1940, at which time it became the Illinois Institute of Technology (IIT); he served as its president until 1952. He is credited with bringing architect Ludwig Mies van der Rohe to Chicago in 1938 to direct IIT's architecture program. He led a team that investigated the idea of a research institute on the west coast and made proposals that would result in the creation of SRI International.

He left IIT in 1952 to become president of New York University. In 1956 he became the president of the Ford Foundation, where he served until 1965.

Honors and legacy
He appeared on the cover of Time in 1957. In 1959, Heald was awarded the Hoover Medal, which recognizes civic and humanitarian achievements by engineers. A scholarship at IIT is named after him.

References

External links

1904 births
1975 deaths
Presidents of Illinois Institute of Technology
Illinois Institute of Technology faculty
Presidents of New York University
20th-century American academics